Ikupasuy are wooden, carved ceremonial sticks used by Ainu men when making offerings to spirits.

Background
The central section of an ikupasuy is decorated, featuring animals, floral motives as well as abstract designs. The ends of an ikupasuy bear designs that represent the patriarchal lineage of the owner. The Ainu believe that the designs on the ends of the ikupasuy help the spirits in identifying the person who made the offering. The underside of the ikupasuy may on some occasions be carved with various symbols called shiroshi. A common shiroshi is symbol representing the killer whale. The pointed end of the ikupasuy is known as the 'tongue'. The libation process is performed when the ikupasuy's ‘tongue' placed into a lacquerware cup or saucer, containing millet beer or sake. Drops of the liquid then fall upon the venerated object. The Ainu limited their representation of animals and to the ikupasuy. Ainu men occasionally used the ikupasuy as a mean to lift their moustaches, leading non Ainu observers of this habit to call them moustache lifters.
Another name is "libation sticks"

See also
Inau
Prayer stick
Sacrifice
Ainu people

References

External links
Beloit College digital collection of Ikupasuy
British Museum digital collection of Ikupasuy
Horniman Museum digital collection of libation sticks

Ainu culture
Libation